Hayim de lah Rozah (also spelled Chaim Delharoza or de la Rosa) was a Spanish rabbi and kabbalist.

After the Spanish expulsion, he wandered until he reached Jerusalem where he joined the chavurah of Rabbi Shalom Sharabi, becoming a scholar of the Beit El Synagogue and a close disciple and friend of Rabbi Sharabi.

Rabbi de lah Rozah authored the sefer Torat Hakham.

Rabbi de lah Rozah lived in the 1700s, long after the Spanish expulsion in 1492.
He was in Greece and Jerusalem, and was a student of Rabbi Shalom Sharabi who died in 1777.

References 

Authors of Rabbinic works
Kabbalists
Rabbis in Jerusalem
Sephardi rabbis
Sephardi rabbis in Ottoman Palestine
Spanish rabbis
Place of birth unknown
Place of death unknown
Year of birth unknown
Year of death unknown